Head Off is the seventh album released by the Swedish rock band The Hellacopters. The album consists of cover songs from acts that the band felt that everyone should know about and listen to. The 2,500 units of the vinyl release all come with a poster, an additional 1,500 units were later pressed which also contained the poster. A special CD box was also available in a limited run of 6,000 copies worldwide and consists of a special CD that contains all of the music on one side that can be played as a regular CD, on the other side the bonus track "Straight Until Morning" and a special pin and patch.

Track listing

Personnel 
The Hellacopters
Nicke Andersson – Lead vocals, guitars, percussion
Robert Dahlqvist – Guitars, backing vocals
Kenny Håkansson – Bass guitar, backing vocals
Anders Lindström – Organ, piano, backing vocals
Robert Eriksson – Drums, backing vocals

Production
Chips Kiesbye – Producer, engineer
Henrik Lipp – Engineer
Stefan Boman – Mixing

References 

2008 albums
The Hellacopters albums
Covers albums